Charles Hurt (born 1971) is an American journalist and political commentator. He is currently the opinion editor of The Washington Times, Fox News contributor, Breitbart News contributor, and a Drudge Report editor. Hurt's views have been considered to be by and large Republican-leaning.

Early career
Hurt began his newspaper career during college at Hampden-Sydney College in Virginia with stints at the Danville Register & Bee, the Richmond Times-Dispatch and the St. Louis Post-Dispatch. His first full-time job after graduating in 1995 was at The Detroit News where he became a replacement worker during a bitter strike. He worked at the paper until 2001, when he moved to the Washington, D.C. area to join the staff of The Charlotte Observer.

Hurt was The New York Post's D.C. Bureau Chief and news columnist covering the White House for five years.

From 2003 to 2007, Hurt covered the U.S. Congress as a reporter for The Washington Times before leaving to join The New York Post. In 2011, he rejoined The Washington Times as a political columnist. In December 2016, Hurt was named the opinion editor.

National Review editor Rich Lowry described Hurt as, "an early adopter of Donald Trump populism." Hurt has written numerous opinion pieces lauding Trump since the 2016 election.

Personal life
Hurt is a native of Chatham, Virginia. Hurt is the son of investigative journalist and former Reader's Digest editor Henry C. Hurt and his wife, Margaret Nolting Williams. His older brother, Robert Hurt, is a former United States Congressman. Charles Hurt had been listed as a possible congressional candidate before his brother's term ended in 2016. Hurt and his wife, Stephanie, have three children.

References

External links

1971 births
Living people
Place of birth missing (living people)
St. Louis Post-Dispatch people
New York Post people
The Washington Times people
The Detroit News people
American reporters and correspondents
American political writers
American male non-fiction writers
People from Chatham, Virginia